The Association for the Study of the Middle East and Africa (ASMEA) is an American learned society, dedicated to promoting research and teaching in Middle Eastern and African studies, and related fields. It was founded on October 24, 2007 by Bernard Lewis (Princeton University) and Fouad Ajami (Hoover Institution) as a rival to the learned society Middle East Studies Association of North America (MESA) as it was regarded to have become "dominated by academics who have been critical of Israel and of America's role in the Middle East."

ASMEA states that its mission is "to promote the highest standards of academic research and teaching in the fields of Middle Eastern and African studies and related disciplines through programs, publications, and services that support its members, the international community of scholars, and interested members of the public."

ASMEA is administrated by Mark T. Clark (California State University at San Bernardino, President), J. Peter Pham (Atlantic Council, Vice President), and Joseph Skelly (College of Mount Saint Vincent, Secretary, Treasurer).

Inaugural conference
ASMEA’s Inaugural Conference — titled The Evolution of Islamic Politics, Philosophy, and Culture in the Middle East and Africa: From Traditional Limits to Modern Extremes — was held in Washington, D.C., April 24–26, 2008. The conference featured a combination of panels and roundtables with academics and policy makers focused on the Islamic influence in these regions. ASMEA chairman, Bernard Lewis, delivered the keynote address titled, "Studying the Other: Different Ways of Looking at the Middle East and Africa," in which he discussed the threat to the freedom of scholarly inquiry regarding these two regions and the prospects for enhancing the body of knowledge in an open and inter-disciplinary manner.

Past conferences
Since its Inaugural Conference in 2008, ASMEA has held an Annual Conference in Washington, D.C.
 Second Annual ASMEA Conference: The Middle East and Africa: Historic Connections and Strategic Bridges was held in Washington, D.C., October 22–24, 2009. ASMEA chairman Bernard Lewis delivered the keynote speech. The 2009 conference featured special presentations from John R. Bolton, Former United States Permanent Representative to the United Nations; Gérard Prunier, senior research fellow at the Centre National de la Recherche Scientifique (CNRS) in Paris; and Isabella Ginor and Gideon Remez, the authors of the award-winning book Foxbats Over Dimona: The Soviets' Nuclear Gamble in the Six-Day War. Additionally, the conference included a panel sponsored by the U.S. Marine Corps University (MCU).
 Third Annual ASMEA Conference: The Middle East and Africa in the 21st Century: Local Trends, Regional Challenges, Global Impacts was held in Washington, D.C., November 4–6, 2010. Opening remarks were made by professor Bernard Lewis. The keynote titled, "How to Stop Failing, From Israel to Pakistan," was delivered by Dr. Leslie H. Gelb (Council on Foreign Relations).
 Fourth Annual ASMEA Conference: Out of the Past, Into the Future: Reflections on the Middle East and Africa was held in Washington, D.C., November 3–5, 2011. Opening remarks were given by H.E. Ali Suleiman Aujali, Ambassador of Libya. The keynote address was delivered by H.E. Barham Salih, Prime Minister of the Kurdistan Region. 
 Fifth Annual ASMEA Conference: History and the "New" Middle East and Africa was held in Washington, D.C., October 11–13, 2012. Opening remarks were delivered by H.E. Houda Ezra Nonoo, Ambassador of the Kingdom of Bahrain. The keynote speech, "Gaddafi's Downfall and its Impact on Sub-Saharan Africa," was presented by acclaimed scholar Dr. Gérard Prunier.
 Sixth Annual ASMEA Conference: Tides of Change: Looking Back and Forging Ahead in the Middle East & Africa was held in Washington, D.C., November 21–23, 2013. Opening remarks were delivered by H.E. Mbarka Bouaida, Minister Delegate of Foreign Affairs and Cooperation, Kingdom of Morocco. The keynote speech was delivered by Mr. Michael Young, opinion editor of the Daily Star newspaper in Beirut. The keynote address was titled, “The Arab Upheavals: A View from Beirut.”
 Seventh Annual ASMEA Conference, Searching for Balance in the Middle East and Africa was held in Washington, D.C., October 30 - November 1, 2014. Opening remarks were delivered by Lukman Faily, Ambassador of the Republic of Iraq to the United States. The keynote address was titled "Rouhani’s Iran: How Real is the Change?" and was delivered by Prof. Meir Litvak, Tel Aviv University.
 The Eighth Annual ASMEA Conference, For Better or Worse? Historical Trends in the Middle East and Africa was held in Washington, D.C. on October 29–31, 2015.

Publications
The Journal of the Middle East and Africa is the flagship publication of ASMEA and "is the first peer-reviewed academic journal to include both the entire continent of Africa and the Middle East within its purview." The Journal publishes four issues a year.

References

External links
 

Academic organizations based in the United States
Middle Eastern studies in the United States
2007 establishments in the United States
Organizations established in 2001